Waldeck is a village in the Canadian province of Saskatchewan within the Rural Municipality of Excelsior No. 166 and Census Division No. 7. Waldeck is 18 kilometres northeast of the City of Swift Current on the Trans-Canada Highway. Waldeck is situated in the Swift Current River Valley.

History 
Waldeck is a German word meaning "Wooded Corner"; the community is probably named after the willows that grew along the banks of the Swift Current Creek.
In 1903 the Canadian Government opened to settlement a tract of land from Swift Current Creek to Herbert. Among the first settlers were Rev. Klaas Peters and Mr. Abraham (probably Abram Klassen) in 1908. Waldeck incorporated as a village on December 23, 1913.

The majority of the people in and around Waldeck are of Mennonite ancestry.

Elon Musk worked on a farm near Waldeck after coming to Canada from South Africa in the late 1980s.

Demographics 

See also 
 List of communities in Saskatchewan
 Villages of Saskatchewan

References

The Bergthaler Mennonites by Klaas Peters. Translated from the German by Margaret Loewen Reimer. With a biography of Klaas Peters by Leonard Doell. CBMC Publications, Winnipeg, Manitoba, 1988.

Villages in Saskatchewan
Excelsior No. 166, Saskatchewan
Division No. 7, Saskatchewan